Kim Shin-young (Hangul: 김신영; born 10 July 1975) is a South Korean retired badminton player. Played for the Jeonbuk bank, she competed at the 1996 Atlanta Olympic Games and 1998 Bangkok Asian Games.

Achievements

World Cup 
Women's doubles

Mixed doubles

Asian Championships 
Mixed doubles

Asian Cup 
Mixed doubles

East Asian Games 
Women's doubles

World Junior Championships 
Mixed doubles

IBF World Grand Prix 
The World Badminton Grand Prix sanctioned by International Badminton Federation (IBF) since 1983.

Women's doubles

Mixed doubles

IBF International 
Women's doubles

References

External links 
 
 

1975 births
Living people
South Korean female badminton players
Badminton players at the 1996 Summer Olympics
Olympic badminton players of South Korea
Badminton players at the 1998 Asian Games
Asian Games bronze medalists for South Korea
Asian Games medalists in badminton
Medalists at the 1998 Asian Games